Alphonse Emile Pierre Decorte (2 August 1909, in Bruges – 31 May 1977, in Bruges) was a Belgian footballer. His position on the field was forward.

Throughout his career, Decorte only played for one team: Cercle Brugge. He made his debut in the 1927-28 season, right after Cercle Brugge's national championship and cup final victory. In Decorte's first match, Cercle lost 5-1 at the pitch of Beerschot. Even though Decorte never really became a first team regular, he managed twice to become top scorer of the team, in 1932 and 1933. He also became national champions with Cercle in the 1929-30 season.

Alphonse Decorte played his last match for Cercle against Daring Club de Bruxelles on 29 December 1935. Cercle lost the match 1-6. Cercle would eventually relegate that season.

External links
Alphonse Decorte at Cerclemuseum.be 

1909 births
1977 deaths
Belgian footballers
Association football forwards
Belgian Pro League players
Cercle Brugge K.S.V. players
Footballers from Bruges